Shu, is a city in  Jambyl Region of Kazakhstan.

The city is located on the Shu River, and is populated by approximately 35,000 people.

Transportation
Shu is an important transportation hub for the southern Kazakhstan / northern Kyrgyzstan region. This is where the east-west Turkestan-Siberia railway is joined with the railway running north to Kazakhstan's new capital, Nur-Sultan and Petropavl, a city on the Transsiberian railway.
There is no direct railroad from Shu to Bishkek serviced by Kazakhstani trains.  This means that every day a large number of passengers travelling  from Astana to Bishkek for example arrive in Shu by train and transfer to minivans and taxis to continue into Kyrgyzstan.  Though it is possible to travel through Shu and on to Bishkek on Kyrgyz trains, it is much longer than transferring to a minivans for the 1.5 hour ride from Shu to Bishkek rather than the 5 to 6 hour train option.
While functioning as a large transportation hub form passengers, Shu's central location makes it a natural large hub for rail freight as well.  All rail freight coming through Shu is resorted and new freight trains are assembled.

Sources

 Places in Kazakhstan starting in Shu

External links 
 Official site

Populated places in Jambyl Region